= Public sector comparator =

In Public Administration, the Public Sector Comparator (PSC) is a tool used by governments in determining the proper service provider for a public sector project. It consists of an estimate of the cost that the government would pay were it to deliver a service by itself. The World Bank has its own definition, wherein a PSC "is used by a government to make decisions by testing whether a private investment proposal offers value for money in comparison with the most efficient form of public procurement." Generally, the PSC allows governments to figure out if a public–private partnership or other arrangement would be more cost effective. The PSC is most commonly used in UK, Australia, Hong Kong, Canada, and the Philippines.
